Anton Jude Gomes, known as Anton Jude (28 November 1960 – 19 March 2012; ඇන්ටන් ජූඩ්) was an actor in Sri Lankan cinema, stage drama and television. A career spanning for more than three decades, Jude was a popular comedian in television and cinema. He is best known for the comedy roles in Sabanda Pabilis, Sikuru Hathe and Sakisanda Suwaris.

He died on 19 March 2012 during a film shooting in Kelaniya.

Early life and career
Jude was born on 28 November 1960 at Rathmalana, the eldest in a family of four children. He was inspired by his father, Clarence Gomes, for his singing talents. He studied at St. Anthony's Roman Catholic school in Mount Lavinia.

Jude made his debut on stage with Sashi Quintes's Sudu Haththak ("White Mushroom") in 1978 and continued acting in films such as Bahubuthayo, Rankewita, Numba Nadan Apata Pissu, Sikuru Hathe, Rosa Kele, Ethumai Methumai and several other popular movies.

He acted in tele dramas Punchi Rala, Sabanda Pabilis, Sakisanda Elias, Isuru Yogaya and others. His song Ais Amma Gundu (Una Puruke Balu Walige) was also a popular hit among the masses. Jude created his first stage drama Sakisanda Madala, where the first screen was held on 29 December 2009 at the Elphinston Theatre.

Illness and death
Jude had been ailing for some time with high blood pressure and diabetes. He had been treated at the Nawaloka hospital in February 2012.
On the evening of 19 March 2012, Jude was rushed to the Colombo North Ragama hospital due to a cardiac arrest and at 11:20 p.m. he was pronounced dead on admission to the hospital. Jude died while he was working on a new film, 'Veeraya, while shooting at the director Sunil Arunasiri's place in Kelaniya. Jude was survived by his wife Manel. On 22 March 2012, his remains were buried at the Borella Cemetery, Colombo.

Filmography

Stage plays
Mee purawesiyo
Sudu Haththak
Saranga Newen Awith

Television

 Abuddassa Kalaya
 Deva Daruwo 
E Brain
 Ekamath Eka Rataka 
 Hit Wicket 
 Isuru Bawana 
 Isuru Yogaya
 Kande Handiya 
 Kota Uda Mandira
 Mehew Rate
 Mila
 Mini Palanga 
 Nadu Ahana Walawwa
Night Learners
 Pinkanda Simona 
Punchi Rala
Ran Samanalayo
Sabanda Pabilis
Sakisanda Eliyas
 Sakisanda Suwaris
 Sihina Pawura 
 Situ Gedara
 Sura Pura Sara 
 Swarna Veena 
 Theth Saha Viyali 
 Three-wheel Malli 
 Vinivindimi

References

External links
ඇන්ටන් ජූඩ්ගේ ආදරණීය බිරිය මානෙල්ගේ අතීත මතක
සඳේ ඇබිද්දක් ඔහොම ඉඳින් - ඇන්ටන් ජූඩ්ගේ අවසන් රංගනය
ආදරණීය රසිකයන්ට ජූඩ්ගෙන් ගී වැස්සක්
ඇන්ටන් ජූඩ් පිළිබඳ සහෘද සටහනක්
ඇත්තටම ජූඩ් එහෙම කිව්වෙ ඇයි
Anton Jude Songs

1960 births
2012 deaths
Sri Lankan male film actors
Sinhalese male actors
Sri Lankan male stage actors
Sri Lankan male television actors
Sri Lankan Roman Catholics